Paracordylodus is an extinct genus of conodonts in the clade Prioniodontida, also known as the "complex conodonts". The species P. gracilis has been recovered from the chert of the Narooma Terrane, a geological structural region on the south coast of New South Wales, Australia.

References

External links 

 
 Paracordylodus at fossilworks.org (retrieved 11 May 2016)

Prioniodontida genera
Ordovician conodonts
Early Ordovician animals
Fossil taxa described in 1971